Osypnoy Bugor is a rural locality (a selo) in Privolzhsky District, Astrakhan Oblast, Russia. The population was 3,381 as of 2010. There are 94 streets.

Geography 
Osypnoy Bugor is located 16 km southwest of Nachalovo (the district's administrative centre) by road. Astrakhan is the nearest rural locality.

References 

Rural localities in Privolzhsky District, Astrakhan Oblast